Hamburger Feuerkasse is the first officially established fire insurance company in the world, and the oldest existing insurance enterprise available to the public, having started in 1676.

History
The basic idea of fire protection was established in the guilds of Schleswig-Holstein, Germany. The roots are tied to the cooperative arrangements of the Teutons of the Middle Ages. The idea was brotherly help to protect one another, especially from fire losses. While many people had the same basic idea, the Teutons took the idea of Christian brotherly love and developed mutual cooperatives exceptionally well. Some of these guilds of Schleswig-Holstein developed into cooperative mutual fire protection groups - the basis of fire insurance. The idea behind the fire insurance cooperative was to provide other guild members with extensive protection and welfare in case of a loss due to fire.

From these early cooperatives of the Middle Ages developed the "fire guilds" as mutual fire insurance associations. Following the Reformation the basic roots of the original ideas changed some and the "fire guilds" developed into specialized fire insurance groups. These specialized "fire guilds" started in the beginning of the fifteenth century. The earliest known statutes were written up in Suederauerdorf in 1537. This then was followed by several "fire guilds" along the west coast of Schleswig-Holstein in the next few years following. The first municipal guild for fire insurance was "Itzehoe Lieb-Frauen Guild" founded in 1543.

Approximately 100 brewery heirs signed the first "Hamburg Fire Contract" on December 3, 1591. This obligated the members to have to pay a certain sum if one of the partners suffered a loss due to fire. They were called brewery heirs because they inherited their breweries. Brewing beer was a very important enterprise in Hamburg in the thirteenth, fourteenth, fifteenth and sixteenth centuries. This first contract was soon followed by several other fire contracts over the next few years with basically the same clauses. It is not sure if the Hamburg fire contracts were modeled after the Schleswig-Holstein guild fire contracts, however the first "Hamburg Fire Contract" of December 3, 1591, specifically states that the principals of the contract were already being used in other parts of Germany. One difference that has been determined however between the Schleswig-Holstein guild fire contracts and the Hamburg fire contracts is that the latter was just for economic compensation, where the former was for rendering mutual help among the members.

The fire contracts of Hamburg turned out to be ineffective against the many fires that happened in Hamburg in the seventeenth century and they could not compensate everyone that had a loss due to fire. The London fire of 1666 also played a role in the ineffectiveness of the fire contracts of Hamburg. For these reasons on September 21, 1676, the Council of Hamburg appointed a committee to establish a "General Fire Office" which would cover the entire city and bring together all the small fire contracts of the city. Ultimately the committee worked out a general fire contract with 16 articles that would cover everything and all the people of the city. With the acceptance of this new general fire contract then the Hamburg "General Fire Office" was established on December 17, 1676. The Hamburger Feuerkasse ("Fire Office") was then officially founded. It is the oldest official insurance company in the world and has served as a model for other fire institutions in Germany.

References

Sources
Anzovin, Steven, Famous First Facts 2000, item # 2420, H. W. Wilson Company, 
Evenden, William, German Fire Insurance Signs, Publisher Versicherungswirtsch., 1989,

External links
 

Financial services companies established in 1676
Insurance companies of Germany
Organizations established in 1676
1676 establishments in the Holy Roman Empire